, son of Nijō Harutaka with Tokugawa Yoshihime (daughter of Tokugawa Munemoto) and adopted son of Kujō Sukeie, was a kuge or Japanese court noble of the Edo period (1603–1868). He, as his father did, adopted son of Nijō Harutaka, Hisatada.

References
 

Fujiwara clan
Kujō family
1784 births
1807 deaths
Nijō family